Ananta Nayak (born 1 May 1969) was a member of the 14th Lok Sabha of India. He represents the Keonjhar constituency of Odisha and is a member of the Bharatiya Janata Party (BJP).

Nayak became the Member of Parliament at the age of 30 from the Kendujhar Parliamentary constituency. He has won twice from the Kendujhar constituency consecutively. He is the President (Tribal Morcha) in India, Bharatiya Janata Party.
On Date 24 Feb 2021 he has appointed as Member of National Commission for Scheduled Tribes, ( A Constitutional body under Article 338A of the Constitution of India.

External links
 Members of Fourteenth Lok Sabha - Parliament of India website

1969 births
Living people
People from Odisha
Bharatiya Janata Party politicians from Odisha
India MPs 1999–2004
India MPs 2004–2009
Lok Sabha members from Odisha
People from Kendujhar district
National Democratic Alliance candidates in the 2014 Indian general election